The 1980 NASCAR Winston Cup Series was the 32nd season of professional stock car racing in the United States and the 9th modern-era NASCAR Cup season. It was the final year with the Gen 2 car. The season began on Sunday, January 13 and ended on Sunday, November 15. Dale Earnhardt won his first Winston Cup championship, winning by 19 points over Cale Yarborough. Jody Ridley was crowned NASCAR Rookie of the Year.

Teams and drivers

Season recap

Notable races
Western 500 – Darrell Waltrip claimed his second straight win in Riverside International Raceway's NASCAR season-opener.  He took the win with crew chief Buddy Parrott; Parrott had been fired from DiGard Racing immediately following the Los Angeles Times 500 the previous November but rehired at the start of January.
Daytona 500 – Buddy Baker ended a career-long drought in the 500 as he dominated.  Darrell Waltrip blew his engine early and angrily ripped the DiGard Racing team in postrace interviews.
Richmond 400 - Darrell Waltrip, Bobby Allison, and Richard Petty combined to lead 345 laps. Petty rallied from a mid-race spin to lead until Waltrip grabbed the lead for the final nineteen laps.  
Carolina 500 – Cale Yarborough drove a backup Oldsmobile to the win, while Benny Parsons survived a hard crash in Turn One.
Atlanta 500 – Cale Yarborough, Bobby Allison, and Donnie Allison dominated the first 300 miles of the race as sophomore Dale Earnhardt clawed from 31st into contention; Donnie Allison and Earnhardt were side by side for the lead when Donnie was hit by Terry Labonte and hit the wall in Turn Three.  Cale broke in the final 60 laps as Earnhardt took the win; finishing second was rookie Rusty Wallace in his first career race.
Southeastern 500 - Earnhardt passed Yarborough and led the final 135 laps for his second straight win and second straight in Bristol's March–April 500-lapper. 
Rebel 500 – Rain shortened the race after halfway as David Pearson, replacing Donnie Allison in Hoss Ellington's car, took his 105th career win.  Neil Bonnett crashed out on the opening lap and Dale Earnhardt led fifteen laps but fell out with engine failure. 
Virginia 500 – NASCAR banned tire changes under caution on short tracks in an effort to save money for race teams.  Darrell Waltrip led 303 laps from the pole to the win.
Winston 500 – On a newly repaved surface Buddy Baker ran down Dale Earnhardt with two laps to go for the win, but was informed on his way to postrace interviews he would be replaced in the Ranier Racing car in 1981.
Music City 420 – Cale Yarborough cut a tire but could not pit under yellow to change it; as a result Richard Petty took his eighth win at the Nashville Fairgrounds.  Petty and Cale were critical of NASCAR's new rule for short tracks banning tire changes under yellow. Petty's win was also Chevrolet's 100th manufacturer win in NASCAR.
Mason-Dixon 500 – Bobby Allison won after leading 126 laps, edging Richard Petty for his first win of the season.  Allison was critical of the Ford racecars he was running, saying "We still need a Chevy for the other tracks."
World 600 – The race ran over seven hours thanks to fourteen yellows for crashes on the newly paved surface and two rain delays lasting two hours.  The lead changed 47 times as Benny Parsons out-dueled Darrell Waltrip; they swapped the lead eight times in the final twenty laps.  Dale Earnhardt's crash at Lap 275 with David Pearson and Cale Yarborough combined with Richard Petty's fourth cut Earnhardt's point lead to under 50; crew chief Jake Elder quit the team after the race, citing an attitude change with Earnhardt and also anger with team manager Roland Wlodyka ("Roland could screw up a five-car funeral.")
Texas 400 – Cale Yarborough led 110 laps from the pole and edged Richard Petty, while point leader Dale Earnhardt led 54 laps but finished a distant ninth in his first race with Doug Richert as crew chief.  Benny Parsons led 30 laps but overheated and fell out.
Gabriel 400 – Benny Parsons, who grew up in the Detroit area, won at Michigan International Speedway for the only time in his career.  Darrell Waltrip fell out with engine failure, and following the race crew chief Buddy Parrott was fired; a fight ensued between Parrott and Robert Yates at the DiGard shop when the team returned home.  Parrott publicly blamed Waltrip for his firing, saying "I'll die before I ever turn another wrench on a Darrell Waltrip car."  Parrott was promptly hired to Ranier Racing.
Firecracker 400 – Bobby Allison edged Earnhardt and Pearson before a scary crash erupted off Turn Four as Phil Finney plowed into an earthen bank and flew twenty feet into the air before landing at the pit road entrance.  The lead changed 41 times.
Coca-Cola 500 – At Pocono Raceway Neil Bonnett survived a physical last lap with Buddy Baker and Yarborough.  The lead changed 50 times, but the story of the race was a bad wreck on Lap 57 as Richard Petty, holding the lead, broke a wheel entering the track's Tunnel Turn, shot into the wall, and bounced into the path of traffic; Petty suffered a broken neck and his title chances effectively ended.
Talladega 500 – Bonnett fought off a last-lap challenge from Dale Earnhardt, Cale Yarborough, and Benny Parsons for the win, the second in a row for Wood Brothers Racing and the final win for the Mercury automobile brand.
Champion Spark Plug 400 – Darrell Waltrip crashed during practice and had to purchase the Joel Halpern Chevrolet to run the 400 at Michigan International Speedway; it was the second time in two seasons Waltrip had to drive another car after his primary DiGard entry was knocked out before the race; Waltrip led 67 laps but a late caution allowed Cale Yarborough to catch up and storm to the win.  Following the race Waltrip stated he was "fed up" with the DiGard situation, saying "I fight the same battles every day."  Richard Petty ran the entire race despite his broken neck and finished fifth.
Southern 500 – In a wild final five laps David Pearson rocketed from midpack into the lead and held off Dale Earnhardt and Benny Parsons, then with two to go all three crashed in Turn Two in oil from a backmarker's blown engine; Pearson limped to the race-deciding yellow, but Terry Labonte raced from nowhere and edged Pearson by a bumper for the win, his first career win.
National 500 – Dale Earnhardt edged Cale Yarborough and Buddy Baker amid an increasingly bitter public contract battle between Darrell Waltrip and his team owner, Bill Gardner, a battle that also involved Junior Johnson, who asserted DiGard had attempted to hire several of Johnson's crewmen out from under him.  Waltrip fought for the lead in the first 100 laps but lost a lap when a sway bar bolt broke off an A arm; he kept battling to get his lap back but crashed with Benny Parsons, who was eligible for a $100,000 bonus for winning the race. 
American 500 – Cale Yarborough led 167 laps en route to his fifth win of the season, but the key development of the race was the 18th place for Dale Earnhardt; his point lead fell to just 44 with two races to go.
Dixie 500 – An early accident eliminated the Allison brothers and Cale Yarborough dominated to the win.  Dale Earnhardt lost a lap and crowded Cale for a prolonged stretch; his point lead over Yarborough was now just 29 points.
Los Angeles Times 500 – Earnhardt lost a lap but made it up and despite taking off from a late green-flag stop with unsecured lug nuts on his tires finished fifth with Yarborough third and Benny Parsons the race winner.  The race was switched from Sunday to Saturday to accommodate live CBS Sports coverage.  Earnhardt's fifth allowed him to win the driving title by 19 points over Yarborough.  Following the race Waltrip succeeded in buying out his contract with DiGard Racing while Yarborough announced he would not run the full season in 1981, taking over the M. C. Anderson #27 team driven by race winner Parsons; Waltrip was then hired by Junior Johnson.

Full Drivers’ Championship

(key) Bold – Pole position awarded by time. Italics – Pole position set by owner's points. * – Most laps led.

References

External links 
 Winston Cup Standings and Statistics for 1980

 

NASCAR Cup Series seasons